John Corbett (March 23, 1926 – September 2, 2013) was an American chemist who specialized in inorganic solid-state chemistry.  At Iowa State and Ames Lab, Corbett lead a research group that focused on the synthesis and characterization of two broad classes of materials, notably Zintl phases and condensed transition metal halide clusters. Both classes of materials are important for their uses, for instance thermoelectrics, and for the theoretical advances they made possible by working to understand their complex bonding and electronic properties.

Career 
Corbett received his Ph.D. in 1952 from the University of Washington. He joined the chemistry faculty of Iowa State University and the scientific staff of Ames Laboratory in 1953.  He was affiliated with both institutions for his entire career.
He was elected a Fellow of the American Association for the Advancement of Science. He was awarded two DOE Awards for Outstanding Scientific Accomplishments and Sustained Research in Materials Chemistry, the Humboldt Prize (1985), the 2005 Spedding Award from the Rare Earth Research Conference, the 2008 Monie A. Ferst Award from Sigma Xi, and several ACS Awards for both Inorganic Chemistry and Distinguished Service in the Advancement of Inorganic Chemistry. 
 He was elected to the United States National Academy of Sciences in 1992.

References

External links 
 Ames Lab homepage
 Iowa State University

American chemists
Iowa State University faculty
University of Washington alumni
2013 deaths
Fellows of the American Academy of Arts and Sciences
Members of the United States National Academy of Sciences
1925 births
Solid state chemists
Inorganic chemists